Kairiai  is a small town in Šiauliai County in northern-central Lithuania. As of 2015 it had a population of 3485.

References
This article was initially translated from the Lithuanian Wikipedia.

Towns in Lithuania
Towns in Šiauliai County
Shavelsky Uyezd
Šiauliai District Municipality